Aref Ghafouri (born 11 December 1989 in Urmia) is an Iranian Azerbaijani Illusionist who won the Merlin Award. He was known in Yetenek Sizsiniz Türkiye. Ghafouri is a citizen of Turkey.

In July 2018, he was bitten by an Egyptian cobra while preparing for a show in Turkey. He was evacuated to Egypt for treatment with the anti-venom, and made a full recovery.

References 

People from Urmia
Living people
1989 births
Turkish magicians
Turkish people of Iranian descent
Iranian emigrants to Turkey